Sleeping Lion may refer to:

 Sleeping lions, a children's game
 Sleeping Lion, Bytom, a sculpture in Bytom, Poland
 , a sculpture in Gliwice, Poland
 The Sleeping Lion, 1919 film